Spirit Poles is a sculpture by Thomas Brewster Kass, installed in Salt Lake City's Jordan Park, in the U.S. state of Utah.

Description and history
Dedicated on July 27, 1985, to represent Korea in the park's International Peace Gardens, the artwork includes two painted telephone poles, each of which measure approximately 12 ft. x 12 1/2 in. x 13 in. The poles have faces and Korean characters. Spirit Poles was surveyed by the Smithsonian Institution's "Save Outdoor Sculpture!" program in 1994.

See also

 1985 in art

References

1985 establishments in Utah
1985 sculptures
Outdoor sculptures in Salt Lake City